Oliver Saunyama (? - January 22, 1980) was a teacher and a ZANU (Sithole) representative in Botswana in 1973. He was a Pan-Africanist.

History
Born in Umtali, Southern Rhodesia and trained as a teacher in the 1950s at St Augustine's Mission in Penhalonga. With this position came great responsibility but it also meant he had to be absent from home often. Five years later he was recalled by the party and he was promoted to be the secretary for welfare. The position also carried with it a seat on the ZANU Central Committee.

Family
He was married to his wife Bessie Saunyama and had six children.

Death
Oliver  was shot and killed on 22 January 1980 by two assailants armed with  AK47 assault rifles while reversing from his house on his way to work. He died instantly from the wounds he sustained. One of his sons witnessed the killing. The reasons put forward for his killing have a link to his strong condemnation for corruption.

References

Zimbabwean educators
Zimbabwe African National Liberation Army personnel
ZANU–PF politicians
Assassinated Zimbabwean politicians
1980 murders in Africa